One Tampa City Center, formerly known as GTE Center and Verizon Building, is an office skyscraper in Tampa, Florida. It was the tallest building in the state for three years and the tallest building in the city until the completion of the Bank of America tower in 1986. At 39 stories tall, it is currently the third tallest structure in the city at 537 feet tall.

History
One Tampa City Center opened in 1981 as the GTE Building. It was the second skyscraper built in the city, after the Park Tower just a few blocks away.

On November 13, 2012, PNC Bank acquired the naming rights for the building from Verizon Communications, which began effective in May 2013.

On October 30, 2014, the building was sold for $128 million to Alliance Partners HSP. Alliance Partners subsequently split the ownership of the land and the building, selling the building in October 2018 for $110 million to Banyan Street Capital and Oaktree Capital Management. HSBC provided an $84 million acquisition loan for the purchase.

Height

The building is among Tampa's tallest buildings, as well as among Florida's tallest.

When it topped out in 1981, One Tampa City Center was the tallest building in Florida for four years, from 1981 to 1984, when it was surpassed by the Wachovia Financial Center, which today is the Southeast Financial Center. The building was the tallest in Tampa from 1981 to 1986, until it was surpassed by neighboring office building the Bank of America Plaza. Today, the building remains the third tallest building in the city.

Tenants
The building holds offices for major companies and law firms, including:

 CDW
 Cushman & Wakefield
 Merrill Lynch
 PNC Bank
 Verizon

See also
List of tallest buildings in Tampa
Downtown Tampa

References

External links
Tampa City Center's official website

1981 establishments in Florida
Office buildings completed in 1981
Skyscraper office buildings in Tampa, Florida
Welton Becket buildings